Cerovica can refer to the following places:

Bosnia and Herzegovina
 Cerovica, Neum
 Cerovica (Bosanski Novi)
 Cerovica (Stanari)

Serbia
 Cerovica (Kučevo)
 Cerovica (Sokobanja)

Slovenia
 Cerovica, Šmartno pri Litiji

Croatia
 Cerovica, Samobor
 Cerovica (Istria)